This is a list of football clubs located in Italy, sorted by division, then alphabetically, and including geographical locations, home stadium information and club positions in the prior season.

Clubs by division

Serie A
2022–23 Serie A clubs. For a complete list of clubs see List of Italian Football Championship clubs.

Serie B
2022–23 Serie B clubs.

Serie C
2022–23 Serie C clubs.

Group A (North)

Group B (Central)

Group C (South)

Former Serie A/B participants in Serie D and below

Former Serie A runner-up Livorno (18 seasons in Serie A, 27 seasons in Serie B) was relegated from Serie C after 2020–21, but the club dissolved before registering for Serie D.

Chievo (17 seasons in Serie A, 10 seasons in Serie B) was excluded from Serie B following an 8th-place finish in 2020-21 due to financial irregularities and failed to register for play in 2021–22.

The below tables listing amateur-level Italian soccer clubs are out of date or incomplete. The following teams are presently participants in Serie D (or lower) but have formerly played at Serie A, the top level of Italian professional football: 
 Catania – 17 seasons in Serie A plus 35 seasons in Serie B
 Varese – 7 seasons in Serie A plus 21 seasons in Serie B (since disbanded and replaced by illegitimate phoenix club Città di Varese in Serie D)
 Casale – 4 seasons in Serie A plus 4 seasons in Serie B
 Legnano – 3 seasons in Serie A plus 14 seasons in Serie B
 Pistoiese – 1 season in Serie A plus 19 seasons in Serie B
 Treviso (Eccellenza participant) – 1 season in Serie A plus 16 seasons in Serie B
 Carpi – 1 season in Serie A plus 5 seasons in Serie B

Further, the following participants of Serie D have previously played at the Serie B level of Italian football but not Serie A: 
 Sambenedettese (21 seasons)
 Arezzo (16 seasons)
 Fanfulla (12 seasons)
 Prato (10 seasons)
 Ravenna (7 seasons)
 Seregno (6 seasons)
 Brindisi (6 seasons)
 Grosseto (6 seasons)
 Campobasso (5 seasons)
 Savona (5 seasons)
 Trapani (5 seasons)
 Barletta (4 seasons)
 Cavese (3 seasons)
 Derthona (3 seasons)
 L'Aquila (3 seasons)
 Nocerina (3 seasons)
 Samremese (3 seasons)
 Savoia (3 seasons)
 Rieti (2 seasons)
 Acireale (2 seasons)
 Crema (2 seasons)
 Casertana (2 seasons)
 Licata (2 seasons)
 Alzano Virescit (1 season)
 Forli (1 season)
 Fermana (1 season)
 Gallipoli (1 season)
 Massese (1 season)
 Matera (1 season)
 Mestre (1 season)
 Sorrento (1 season)
 Ponte San Pietro Isola (1 season as Vita Nova)

Other teams that have participated in Serie B since 1948 but now compete in Eccellenza or Promozione:

 Città di Siracusa (7 seasons) – Eccellenza
 Pavia (4 seasons) – Eccellenza
 Virtus Lanciano (4 seasons) – Eccellenza
 Piombino (3 seasons) – Promozione
 Castel di Sangro (2 seasons) – Promozione
 Trani (2 seasons) – Promozione
 Portogruaro (1 season) – Eccellenza

15 other clubs have fielded a Serie B team in 1948 or earlier, but now field squads languishing in the lower rungs of the football pyramid since that time. These include:

 Vigevano Calcio (11 seasons) 
 Marzotto (10 seasons)
 Viareggio (6 seasons)
 Monfalcone (4 seasons)
 Gallaratese (2 seasons)
 Biellese (2 seasons)
 Pro Gorizia (2 seasons)
 Suzzara (2 seasons)
 Scafatese (2 seasons)
 Vogherese (2 seasons)
 Sestrese (1 season)
 Molinella (1 season)
 Maceratese (1 season)
 Centese (1 season)
 Magenta (1 season)

5 other teams have played in Serie B but are now considered permanently defunct: 
 A.C. Virtus Bolzano – Ceased operations in 2017
 Grion Pola – Territory ceded to Croatia
 Fiumana – Territory ceded to Croatia
 Alba Trastevere – Merged into Roma
 M.A.T.E.R. – Dissolved in 1945

References

See also
Italian football league system
List of football teams

Italy
clubs